D'scover is the debut Japanese studio album by South Korean artist, Daesung, also known by his Japanese stage name, D-Lite, member and main vocalist of boy band Big Bang. The album consists of a number of rearrangements and remakes of Japanese songs as well as multiple original pieces and was released on February 27, 2013.

Background
Following the success of Big Bang's fifth mini-album, Alive, and their world tour, the members decided to pursue solo activities. During this time, the leader of BigBang, G-Dragon released his first mini-album and plans were made for another solo album by vocalist, Taeyang. The remaining members, T.O.P and Seungri, undertook ventures away from music such as acting and hosting and guesting on Japanese variety TV shows. Daesung himself wanted to release an album in Japan and began making preparations in late 2012.

Promotion

Release
On December 5, 2012, a press release was held by Daesung's label YG Entertainment revealing their intentions to release a solo album on February 27, 2013. It was announced that is would be composed of 12 songs, including rearrangements of popular Japanese songs as well as his original songs "Baby Don't Cry" and "Wings". It was also announced that he would be holding his first solo concerts at Kobe’s World Memorial Hall from March 23 to the 24th and the Tokyo Nippon Budokan from March 30 to the 31st to promote the album.

A month before its release, on January 30, 2013, the track list and album covers were revealed, as well as details about the differing versions of the album. The album will be released in a CD only version, a CD and DVD version, and a Playbutton version. The DVD will contain music videos of "Singer's Ballad" (Japanese: 歌うたいのバラッド; Romanization: Utautai no Ballad) and "Wings" as well as a 'making of' video. Additionally, previews of multiple songs were released by various Japanese radio stations to promote the album.

On February 5, 2013, the music video (short version) for "Singer's Ballad" was released. Several days later, on February 9, 2013, the full music video for "Singer's Ballad" was aired on Japanese music video programs.

D'scover Tour 2013 in Japan
Initially, it was announced that Daesung would hold a total of four concerts at Kobe and Tokyo to promote the album.  However, on February 28, it was announced that due to high demand, Daesung would be holding an additional 21 concerts over 17 cities, bringing the total to 25 concerts over 18 cities. The concert tour began on March 23 at Kobe's World Memorial Hall and ended on June 18 at Kanagawa's Yokohama Arena.

Track listing

Charts

Oricon Charts (Japan)

Release history

References

External links

2013 albums
Avex Group albums
YG Entertainment albums
Daesung albums
Albums produced by Seiji Kameda
Albums produced by G-Dragon